Wang Kai (Chinese: 王凯; Pinyin: Wáng Kǎi; born 18 January 1989 in Wuhan) is a Chinese football player who currently plays for China League Two club Wuhan Jiangcheng.

Club career
Wang received football training at Qinhuangdao Football School and Shaanxi Guoli before he joined Zhejiang Greentown youth team system in 2006.   He started his professional career in 2007 when he was sent to China League Two side Hangzhou Sanchao (Zhejiang Greentown Youth). He was promoted to Hangzhou Greentown's first team squad by Zhou Suian in 2009. On 5 October 2009, he made his Super League debut in a 1–0 away defeat against Shandong Luneng Taishan, coming on as a substitute for Cai Chuchuan in the 86th minute. Wang failed to establish himself within the first team and was released at the end of 2013 season.

Wang played for amateur club Wuhan Hongxing between 2014 and 2016. Wuhan Hongxing involved in an on-field brawl in the third round of 2016 Chinese FA Cup and was banned from all future matches organised by the Chinese Football Association in May 2016. Wang was one of the few Wuhan players not to participate the brawl. He joined another amateur club Wuhan Chufeng Heli in July 2016.

On 24 January 2017, Wang returned to professional football and moved to China League One side Zhejiang Yiteng. He made his debut for the club on 11 March 2017 in a 1–0 home win over Xinjiang Tianshan Leopard, coming on as a substitute for injury Romeo Castelen in the 24th minute.

On 24 January 2019, Wang transferred to his hometown club of Wuhan Zall, who were newly promoted to the first-tier. He would make his debut on 1 March 2019 against Beijing Sinobo Guoan F.C. in a league game that ended in a 1-0 defeat.

Career statistics 
Statistics accurate as of match played 31 December 2020.

References

External links
 

1989 births
Living people
Chinese footballers
Association football midfielders
Footballers from Wuhan
Zhejiang Professional F.C. players
Zhejiang Yiteng F.C. players
Wuhan F.C. players
Chinese Super League players
China League One players
China League Two players
21st-century Chinese people